Dean George Howell (born 29 November 1980) is an English former professional footballer, who played at left-back or left-midfield.

Schoolboy and trainee
Howell started as a schoolboy at Stoke City before moving to Notts County as a trainee. He then signed a professional contract in July 1999. Howell was then loaned out to Spalding United for the 1999–2000 season.

Career

In July 2000, Howell then joined Crewe Alexandra, after impressed manager Dario Gradi during his two-week trial. Crewe Alexandra then loaned out Howell, first of all, for two months to Rochdale and then to Southport for a month. His move to Southport was made permanent with a two-year contract, after making an impressive start at Haig Avenue.

Howell then moved up the Lancashire coast to Christie Park, when he signed for Morecambe after Southport were relegated. Howell was then released at the end of the season and signed for Halifax Town.

In August 2005, Howell joined Colchester United on a six-month contract. Unfortunately, a double hernia restricted his appearances before he returned to Halifax Town, where injury again restricted him to just one appearance in four months. Howell's next move was in June 2006, when Howell joined Weymouth following his release by Halifax Town. He made just 17 appearances before joining Grays Athletic.

In the summer of 2007, Howell joined up with his former manager Garry Hill at Rushden & Diamonds. During the 2007–08 season, he made 49 appearances in all competitions, including the Conference League Cup final defeat by Aldershot Town. In May 2008, Howell left Nene Park and became Aldershot Town's first signing of the summer. In November 2008, after limited appearances for Aldershot Town, Howell was loaned out to Bury on a one-month loan.

He joined Crawley Town in July 2010 after he was released by Aldershot. He was named in the Conference Team of the Year for the 2010–11 season after Crawley won the title and so promotion to League Two. In May 2012, Howell was released by the club after being deemed surplus to requirements. He then joined newly promoted Football League Two side Fleetwood Town on a two-year deal.

On 5 November 2013, Dean re-joined League Two side Bury. He signed a loan move to keep him at the club until 5 January 2014.

Personal life
Howell is vegan and has launched his own vegan organic food company.

Career statistics

Honours
Crawley Town
Conference National: 2010–11

References

External links

1980 births
Sportspeople from Burton upon Trent
Living people
Association football defenders
Association football midfielders
English footballers
Notts County F.C. players
Crewe Alexandra F.C. players
Spalding United F.C. players
Rochdale A.F.C. players
Southport F.C. players
Morecambe F.C. players
Halifax Town A.F.C. players
Colchester United F.C. players
Weymouth F.C. players
Grays Athletic F.C. players
Rushden & Diamonds F.C. players
Aldershot Town F.C. players
Crawley Town F.C. players
Fleetwood Town F.C. players
English Football League players
National League (English football) players